Campitello di Fassa (Ladin: Ciampedèl) is a comune (municipality) in Trentino in the northern Italian region Trentino-Alto Adige/Südtirol, located about  northeast of Trento (100 km by road).

In the census of 2001, 625 inhabitants out of 732 (85.4%) declared Ladin as their native language.

Geography

Campitello di Fassa borders the following municipalities: Santa Cristina Gherdëina, Sëlva, Kastelruth, Canazei, Tiers, and Mazzin.

Demographic evolution

References

Cities and towns in Trentino-Alto Adige/Südtirol